Hindustan Standard  is an English-language daily published from Kolkata by the ABP Group. It is headquartered at 3, Burman Street, Kolkata. In 1937, Suresh Chandra Majumdar started the daily in English, and it soon became a leading newspaper owned by Indians in Kolkata, competing with British-owned The Statesman, along with its Bengali language sister-publication Ananda Bazaar Patrika. The Delhi edition is started in 195. Ashwini Kumar Gupta, an ex freedom fighter and the father of the McKinsey and Galleon group finance wizard Rajat Gupta is one of the first correspondents at the Delhi office of Hindustan Standard.

The magazine The Sunday started as the weekend supplement with the newspaper, and was made a stand-alone magazine in 1976 by Aveek Sarkar, with MJ Akbar as the editor.

References 

Newspapers published in Kolkata
Daily newspapers published in India
Defunct newspapers published in India
Newspapers established in 1937
English-language newspapers published in India
Publications disestablished in 1982
ABP Group
1937 establishments in India
1982 disestablishments in India